The William B. Durgin Company (1853 - 1924) was a noted American sterling silver manufacturer based in Concord, New Hampshire, and one of the largest flatware and hollowware manufacturers in the United States. Over the period 1905-1924 it was merged into the Gorham Manufacturing Company.

The company was founded by silversmith William Butler Durgin (July 29, 1833 - May 6, 1905). Durgin was born in Campton, New Hampshire, and from 1849-1853 apprenticed to Boston silversmith Newell Harding. In the 1840s Durgin moved back to Concord, where he opened a small shop making spoons opposite the Free Bridge Road. He incorporated as William B. Durgin Company in 1853, in 1854 added the manufacture of silverware, and in 1866 established a large brick factory on School Street. In 1905, after the death of both Durgin and his son, George F. Durgin, the company was acquired by Gorham through a long process that culminated with an official purchase in 1924. Production was moved to Providence, Rhode Island, in 1931.

The company made the Davis Cup, the silver service for the battleship USS New Hampshire, and medals for St. Paul's School. Its Fairfax flatware was for some years the best-selling pattern in the United States. Other of the company's patterns included Bead, Chatham, Chrysanthemum, Cromwell, Dauphin, English Rose, Essex, Fairfax, Hunt Club, Iris, Lenox, Louis XV, Madame Royale, Marechal Niel, New Vintage, Orange Blossom, Sheaf of Wheat, Victorian/Sheraton, and Watteau.

References 
 William B. Durgin Co., Family Genealogy and Durgin Company History, Robert M. Wilhelm, American Spoon Collectors, 2014.
 A Catalogue of the Fairfax Sterling Silver Flatware: Designed, Patented, and Manufactured Solely by William B. Durgin Co., Concord, New Hampshire, William B. Durgin Company.
 Encyclopedia of American Silver Manufacturers, Dorothy T. Rainwater, Schiffer Pub., 1986, page 51.
 Silver in America, 1840-1940: A Century of Splendor, Charles Lane Venable, Dallas Museum of Art, 1995, page 318.
 "He Might Have Become a Successful Farmer", in The Granite State Monthly, Volume 57, Otis Grant Hammond, Granite Monthly Co., 1925.
 "The Farm Boy Who Built New Hampshire's Only Silver Industry: Concord's William Butler Durgin (1833-1935)", Cow Hampshire.
 "Durgin Sterling Silverware Company - A Brief History", I Collect Sterling.
 "William B. Durgin Company", photographs, Fine Arts Museums of San Francisco.
 "Du-Dz", American Sterling Silver Marks.
 "William B. Durgin Co.", Silver Matching Company.
 "William B. Durgin Company, 1915", New Hampshire Historical Society.

American silversmiths